Kaliam Awan Railway Station (Urdu and ) is located in Kaliamawan village, Rawalpindi district of Punjab, Pakistan.

See also
 List of railway stations in Pakistan
 Pakistan Railways

References

External links

Railway stations in Rawalpindi District
Railway stations on Karachi–Peshawar Line (ML 1)